Michele Cremonesi (born 15 April 1988) is an Italian professional footballer who plays as a centre-back for  club Reggiana.

Club career
On 10 November 2021, he joined Reggiana in Serie C.

International
He represented Italy at the 2005 UEFA European Under-17 Championship (3rd place) and the 2005 FIFA U-17 World Championship.

References

External links
 Career summary by playerhistory.com 
 

1988 births
Living people
Association football defenders
Italian footballers
Italy under-21 international footballers
Italy youth international footballers
U.S. Cremonese players
F.C. Crotone players
S.P.A.L. players
Virtus Entella players
A.C. Perugia Calcio players
Venezia F.C. players
A.C. Reggiana 1919 players
Serie A players
Serie B players
Serie C players